An outbreak of seven tornadoes struck the Central Plains and Mississippi in Late-April 1950. Five of the seven tornadoes were significant (F2+), including two violent F4 tornadoes in Texas and Oklahoma, both of which killed five. Overall, the outbreak killed 11, injured 38, and caused $1.575 million in damage. A lightning strike at Lake Texoma in Oklahoma caused an additional fatality and injury as well.

Meteorological synopsis
A surge of deep tropical moisture streamed northward out of the Gulf of Mexico and into the Southern Plains on April 28. A warm front extended southeastward out of the Rockies before curling northeastward over the Southern Texas Panhandle and transitioning into a cold front over North Central Oklahoma. A dryline extended outward from the southern part of the warm front to a low pressure system over Northern Mexico just south of the Texas border. Although wind shear was modest a best, favorable turning of height was noted. All these ingredients led to the development of severe thunderstorms and tornadoes.

Confirmed tornadoes

April 28 event

April 29 event

Non-tornadic events
Scattered severe thunderstorms affected areas from the Central Plains to the Southeast on April 28. In North Carolina, large hail covered an area of 4 square miles in Central Pasquotank County, 50 square miles of Eastern Perquimans County, and 2 square miles in Central Nash County. In St. Louis, Missouri, lightning struck and damaged several streetcars while strong winds caused some additional minor damage along with knocking down telephone poles. Right before the Clyde, Texas F4 tornado further to the east, a storm produced large hail the dented cars and house roofs and destroyed neon signs. April 29 saw more severe weather across Mississippi, Texas, Oklahoma and Louisiana. In Mississippi, strong winds damaged or destroyed timber and power and communications lines in Lincoln County as well as swath from Woodville to Liberty, Mississippi. Large hail in Copiah County damaged tomato plants and buds and destroyed cabbage crops. There was also some hail damage in Claiborne Parish, Louisiana. At Lake Texoma, in Bryan County, Oklahoma, a lightning strike hit near a boat containing two men on the water, killing one of them and injuring the other.

Over 1,000 lambs were lost in one community and heavy drifting blocked many roads. Some young livestock was lost.

See also
List of North American tornadoes and tornado outbreaks
List of F4 and EF4 tornadoes
Tornado outbreak of April 28–30, 1960

Notes

References

Tornadoes of 1950
F4 tornadoes
Tornadoes in Oklahoma
Tornadoes in Kansas
Tornadoes in Texas
Tornadoes in Mississippi